Carneades championi is a species of beetle in the family Cerambycidae. It was described by Bates in 1885. It is known from Costa Rica and Panamá.

References

Colobotheini
Beetles described in 1885